Corbitt is a surname. Notable people with the surname include:

 Claude Corbitt (1915–1978), American baseball player
 Don Corbitt (1924–1993), American football player
 Gregory Corbitt (born 1971), Australian field hockey player
 Helen Corbitt (1906 – 1978), American chef and cookbook author
 James Corbitt (1913–1950), English murderer
 Michael J. Corbitt (1944–2004), American police chief
 Ted Corbitt (1919–2007), American long-distance runner

See also
 Corbitt (automobile company), an American automobile, truck, and farm equipment manufacturer
 Corbett (surname)